Lieutenant-Colonel Sir Edward Boscawen Frederick, 9th Baronet,  (29 June 1880 – 26 October 1956) was a British Army officer, first-class cricketer and courtier.

Early life and education

Frederick was born at Loppington Hall, Shropshire. He was the second son of Sir Charles Frederick, 7th baronet, and grandson of General Edward Frederick.  He was educated at Eton College and the Royal Military College, Sandhurst.

Career
From Sandhurst, Frederick was commissioned a second lieutenant in the Royal Fusiliers on 11 February 1899. He fought with the 2nd battalion in the Second Boer War and was present at the battles of Colenso (December 1899) and the Tugela Heights (February 1900), leading to the Relief of Ladysmith (1 March 1900), following which he was promoted to lieutenant on 16 March 1900. Serving in the Transvaal in 1900, he stayed in South Africa throughout the war which ended with the Peace of Vereeniging in June 1902. Four months later he left Cape Town on the SS Salamis with other officers and men of the battalion, arriving at Southampton in late October, when the battalion was posted to Aldershot.

He returned to Sandhurst as an instructor from 1912 to 1914, but returned to active duty at the beginning of the First World War. He was severely wounded and placed on the retired list in 1919.

In 1925, he was appointed an Exon in the King's Bodyguard of the Yeomen of the Guard. He served as Ensign from 1937 until his retirement in 1950. He succeeded to the baronetcy in 1938 upon on the death of his brother, Charles Edward St John Frederick.  During the Second World War, he commanded a battalion of the Home Guard.

Frederick was appointed  Commander of the Royal Victorian Order (CVO) in the 1944 New Year Honours.

Cricket

Frederick played first-class cricket from 1903 to 1907. He was a right-handed batsman who bowled right-arm slow.

Frederick made his first-class debut for Hampshire against Leicestershire during the 1903 County Championship. From 1903 to 1905 Frederick represented Hampshire in five County Championship matches, with his final first-class match for Hampshire coming against Yorkshire. In his five matches for the club, Frederick took 9 wickets at a bowling average of 36.77, with best figures of 3-41.

In 1907, Frederick represented the Europeans (India), making his debut against the Parsees in the final of the Bombay tournament. This was Frederick's final first-class match, during which he claimed a single wicket.

Family

In 1913, Frederick married Edith Katherine Cortlandt, daughter of Colonel William Hutchinson Mulloy. They had two sons and a daughter. The younger son, Lieutenant John Christopher Frederick, was killed in action during the Second World War in 1943 in Tunisia. His surviving son, Major Charles Boscawen Frederick, inherited the baronetcy.

Frederick's uncle John Frederick played first-class cricket for Oxford University, Hampshire, Middlesex and the Marylebone Cricket Club.

References

External links
Edward Frederick at Cricinfo
Edward Frederick at CricketArchive

1880 births
1956 deaths
Baronets in the Baronetage of Great Britain
Commanders of the Royal Victorian Order
People educated at Eton College
Graduates of the Royal Military College, Sandhurst
British Army personnel of the Second Boer War
British Army personnel of World War I
Officers of the Yeomen of the Guard
Sportspeople from Shropshire
English cricketers
Hampshire cricketers
Europeans cricketers
Royal Fusiliers officers
Military personnel from Shropshire